Harrington is a town in Washington County, Maine, United States. The population was 962 at the 2020 census. Harrington is an old seafaring and shipbuilding village.

History

Originally called Plantation Number 5, it was one of six townships east of the Union River granted in 1762 by the Massachusetts General Court to an association of petitioners. First settled about 1765, it had a population of 177 on June 17, 1797, when incorporated as Harrington.

Farmers grew wheat and potatoes in the town's sandy loam. Harrington developed a considerable trade in lumber, and by 1859 contained two sawmills, three shingle mills and two lath mills. There was a gristmill, two brickyards, a tannery, and eighteen shipbuilders. In 1886, industries also included a sailmaker, and a boot and shoe manufacturer. Gallison Memorial Library still operates a limited schedule in Harrington.

Geography

The town is at the head of Narraguagus Bay, and situated beside Harrington Bay and Pleasant Bay on the Gulf of Maine. It is drained by Curtis Creek, the Mill River and the Harrington River.

Harrington is crossed by U.S. Route 1 and U.S. Route 1A. It is bordered by the towns of Milbridge to the west, Cherryfield to the northwest, Columbia to the north, and Addison to the east.

Demographics

2010 census

As of the census of 2010, there were 1,004 people, 419 households, and 290 families living in the town. The racial makeup of the town was 97.5% White, 0.4% African American, 0.1% Native American, 0.3% Asian, 0.6% from other races, and 1.1% from two or more races. Hispanic or Latino of any race were 2.8% of the population.

There were 419 households, of which 29.1% had children under the age of 18 living with them, 54.2% were married couples living together, 8.8% had a female householder with no husband present, 6.2% had a male householder with no wife present, and 30.8% were non-families. 24.1% of all households were made up of individuals, and 12.2% had someone living alone who was 65 years of age or older. The average household size was 2.38 and the average family size was 2.76.

The median age in the town was 44.9 years. 21.1% of residents were under the age of 18; 6.9% were between the ages of 18 and 24; 22.3% were from 25 to 44; 31.3% were from 45 to 64; and 18.7% were 65 years of age or older. The gender makeup of the town was 49.8% male and 50.2% female.

2000 census

As of the census of 2000, there were 882 people, 364 households, and 256 families living in the town. The racial makeup of the town was 98.07% White, 0.11% Native American, 0.57% from other races, and 1.25% from two or more races. Hispanic or Latino of any race were 1.70% of the population.

There were 364 households, out of which 29.1% had children under the age of 18 living with them, 57.4% were married couples living together, 9.1% had a female householder with no husband present, and 29.4% were non-families. 22.5% of all households were made up of individuals, and 10.2% had someone living alone who was 65 years of age or older.  The average household size was 2.41 and the average family size was 2.79.

In the town, the population was spread out, with 21.5% under the age of 18, 7.3% from 18 to 24, 26.5% from 25 to 44, 28.3% from 45 to 64, and 16.3% who were 65 years of age or older.  The median age was 42 years. For every 100 females, there were 91.7 males.  For every 100 females age 18 and over, there were 91.7 males.

The median income for a household in the town was $26,579, and the median income for a family was $29,211. Males had a median income of $24,038 versus $16,447 for females. The per capita income for the town was $13,224.  About 14.9% of families and 19.2% of the population were below the poverty line, including 31.9% of those under age 18 and 9.1% of those age 65 or over.

Education

 The town is home to Narraguagus High School.

Notable people

 Irv Ray, MLB player, Boston Beaneaters, Baltimore Orioles

References

External links
 Town of Harrington, Maine
 Gallison Memorial Library
 Shellfish Hatchery – Oak Point Oysters
 Maine.gov – Harrington, Maine

Towns in Washington County, Maine
Towns in Maine
Populated coastal places in Maine
1765 establishments in Massachusetts